Trickle is the second and most recent album from English trip hop band Olive.

History 

Following the band's debut album Extra Virgin and a subsequent promotional tour, keyboard programmer Robin Taylor-Firth left the band. Also during this time the UK arm of record label RCA lost interest in supporting the band; as a result, Olive was dropped from the RCA roster.

By this time, the follow-up album had been completed, including a cover of the 1975 UK number-one single "I'm Not in Love" by 10cc (chosen partially as an attempt to obtain better favour with RCA). However, Olive then signed with Maverick Records, after reportedly being discovered by label founder Madonna when she attended one of their concerts in Germany; initially, the band were recruited for a contribution to the soundtrack to the Madonna film The Next Best Thing, and a recording contract resulted from the contact.

"I'm Not in Love" became the band's contribution to the February 2000-released soundtrack, and Trickle was subsequently released in May; "I'm Not in Love" then also became the lead single (and only single) released from the album in June.

Track listing

Credits 

Olive are:
 Ruth-Ann Boyle – vocals
 Tim Kellett – keyboards, trumpet, flugelhorn

Other musicians:
 Guy Davie – mastering
 Mark "Tufty" Evans – mix engineer
 Tony Foster – acoustic guitar, electric guitar
 Robin Guthrie – guitar
 Ian Kirkham – EWI
 Vinnie Lammi – drums
 Roger Lyons – programming, additional keyboards
 Wil Malone – string arrangements
 James McNichol – assistant engineer
 Vini Reilly – guitar
 Steve Sidwell – Nyman Orchestra arrangements

Ian Kirkham was a member of Simply Red alongside Kellett (and remains a member to date). Vini Reilly is the leader of The Durutti Column, which Kellett played in during the 1980s.

Notes and references 

2000 albums
Olive (band) albums
Maverick Records albums